Deimantė Kizalaitė (born 1 August 1999) is a Lithuanian figure skater. She qualified for the free skate at the 2014 World Junior Championships in Sofia and at the 2015 World Junior Championships in Tallinn. She is the sister of ice dancer Deividas Kizala.

Programs

Competitive highlights 
CS: Challenger Series; JGP: Junior Grand Prix

References

External links 
 

1999 births
Lithuanian female single skaters
Living people
Sportspeople from Kaunas